is a Japanese professional footballer who plays as a midfielder for Malaysia Super League club Kelantan United.

Career statistics

Club

Notes

References

1996 births
Living people
Sportspeople from Hyōgo Prefecture
Association football people from Hyōgo Prefecture
Japanese footballers
Japanese expatriate footballers
Association football midfielders
Montenegrin First League players
Serbian First League players
Ettan Fotboll players
FK Berane players
FK Ibar Rožaje players
RFK Grafičar Beograd players
OFK Beograd players
FC Linköping City players
Vasalunds IF players
Japanese expatriate sportspeople in Montenegro
Expatriate footballers in Montenegro
Japanese expatriate sportspeople in Serbia
Expatriate footballers in Serbia
Japanese expatriate sportspeople in Sweden
Expatriate footballers in Sweden